Ross  is a region of Scotland. One of the provinces of Scotland from the 9th century, it gave its name to a later earldom and to the counties of Ross-shire and, later, Ross and Cromarty. The name Ross allegedly derives from a Gaelic word meaning "headland", perhaps a reference to the Black Isle. Another possible origin is the West Norse word for Orkney – Hrossey – meaning horse island; the area once belonged to the Norwegian (West Norse) earldom of Orkney. Ross is a historical comital region, perhaps predating the Mormaerdom of Ross.  It is also a region used by the Kirk, with the Presbytery of Ross being part of the Synod of Ross, Sutherland and Caithness.

History 

Excavations of a rock shelter and shell midden at Sand, Applecross on the coast of Wester Ross have shown that the coast was occupied by Mesolithic hunter-gatherers.

Ptolemy's 2nd century Geography lists a tribe called the Decantae occupying the area that would later become Easter Ross. It may be doubted whether the Romans ever effected even a temporary settlement in the area of the modern county. In Roman times, and for long afterwards, the land was occupied by Picts, who, in the 6th and 7th centuries, were converted to Christianity by followers of Saint Columba. Throughout the next three centuries the natives were continually harassed by Norwegian Viking raiders, of whose presence tokens have survived in several place-names (Dingwall, Tain, and others). At this time the country formed part of the great province of Moray (Latin: Moravia), which then extended as far as the Dornoch Firth and the Oykel, and included practically the whole of Ross and Cromarty.

Ross is first recorded as a territorial unit in a hagiography of the Scottish-born saint Cathróe of Metz, written in Metz shortly after the saint's death between 971 and 976.

William, the 4th Earl of Ross, was present with his clan at the Battle of Bannockburn (1314), and almost a century later (1412) the castle of Dingwall, the chief seat on the mainland of Donald, Lord of the Isles, was captured by Donald just before the battle of Harlaw in Aberdeenshire, which Donald fought because the ambitious Stewarts, governing in the absence of James I, rejected his wife Mariota's rightful claim to the earldom. After the battle, the people of Ross embraced Donald and Mariota as rightful rulers of the earldom notwithstanding the Duke of Albany (a Stewart) purporting to give it to his son. Donald died in 1423 and in 1424 the earldom reverted to the crown, but James I soon afterwards restored it to Mariota, wife of Donald Macdonald, and the heiress of the earldom. She was the mother of Alexander Macdonald, Lord of the Isles, who thus became the 11th Earl. 

In consequence, however, of the treason of John Macdonald, 4th and last Lord of the Isles and 12th Earl of Ross, the earldom was again vested in the crown (1476). Five years later James III bestowed it on his second son, James Stewart, whom he also created Duke of Ross in 1488.

By the 16th century the whole area of the county was occupied by different clans. The Rosses held what is now Easter Ross; the Munros the small tract around Ben Wyvis, including Dingwall; the Macleods Lewis, and, in the mainland, the district between Loch Maree and Loch Torridon; the Macdonalds of Glengarry, Coigach, and the district between Strome Ferry and Kyle of Lochalsh, and the Mackenzies the remainder.

The county of Ross was constituted in 1661, and Cromarty in 1685 and 1698, both being consolidated into the present county in 1889.

Apart from occasional conflicts between rival clans, the only battles in the county were at Invercarron, at the head of Dornoch Firth, when Montrose was crushed by Colonel Archibald Strachan on 27 April 1650; and at Glenshiel, where the Jacobites, under the Earl of Seaforth, aided by Spaniards, were defeated by a force under the command of General Joseph Wightman on 10 June 1719.

Geography

Ross lies south of Sutherland and the Dornoch Firth, west of the North Sea and the Moray Firth, north of the Beauly Firth and Inverness-shire and east of The Minch. There are also a number of small islands off the area's west coast, among which are:

 Gillean (lighthouse) in the parish of Lochalsh
 Crowlin Islands in Applecross
 Eilean Horrisdale, and Isle of Ewe in Gairloch parish
 Isle Martin and Tanera More, of the Summer Isles group in the parish of Lochbroom

On the North Sea (eastern) side of the county the major firths are the Beauly Firth and the (Inner) Moray Firth, which separate the Black Isle from Inverness-shire; the Cromarty Firth, which bounds the districts of Easter Ross and the Black Isle; the Moray Firth, separating Easter Ross from Nairnshire; and the Dornoch Firth, dividing north-east Ross from Sutherland.

On the Atlantic (western) coastline—which has a length of nearly —the principal sea lochs and bays, from south to north, are Loch Duich, Loch Alsh, Loch Carron, Loch Kishorn, Loch Torridon, Loch Shieldaig, Upper Loch Torridon, Gair Loch, Loch Ewe, Gruinard Bay, Loch Broom and Enard Bay.

The chief capes include Tarbat Ness on the east coast, and Coigach, Greenstone Point, Rubha Reidh, Redpoint and Hamha Point on the west.

Almost all the southern boundary with Inverness-shire consists of a rampart of peaks, many of them Munros:
 An Riabhachan,
 Sgurr na Lapaich,
 Carn Eige (Càrn Eighe),
 Mam Sodhail (Mam Soul),
 Beinn Fhada (Ben Attow),
 Sgurr Fhuaran,
 The Saddle.

To the north of Glen Torridon are the masses of Liathach, Beinn Eighe, Beinn Alligin and Beinn Dearg. On the northeastern shore of Loch Maree rises Slioch, while the Fannich group contains six Munros, the highest being Sgurr Mor. The immense isolated bulk of Ben Wyvis, forms the most noteworthy feature in the north-east, and An Teallach in the north-west appears equally conspicuous, though less solitary. Only a small fraction of the west and south of the area is under  in height. Easter Ross and the peninsula of the Black Isle are comparatively level.

At Aultgowrie the stream rushes through a narrow gorge where the drop is considerable enough to make the Falls of Orrin. The River Blackwater flows from mountains in Strathvaich southeast for  until it joins the Conon, forming soon after it leaves Loch Garve the small but picturesque Falls of Rogie. Situated above Glen Elchaig in the southwest of the region are the Falls of Glomach. The stream giving rise to them drains a series of small lochs on the northern flanks of Beinn Fhada (Ben Attow) and, in an almost unbroken sheet over a metre in width, effects a sheer drop of 110 m, and soon afterwards ends its course in Glen Elchaig. The falls are usually visited from Invershiel 11 km to the south-west. 12 miles south-east of Ullapool, on the estate of Braemore, are the Falls of Measach, formed by the Droma, a headstream of the River Broom. The cascades, three in number, are close to Corrieshalloch Gorge. The River Oykel, throughout its course, forms the boundary with Sutherland.

There are many freshwater lochs, the largest being Loch Maree. It contains several wooded islands, and drains into Enard Bay by the River Polly. Once drained by the Muice (Allt na Muice), it has been tapped a little farther west by the Abhainn na Fhasaigh, which has lowered the level of the loch.

Of the straths or valleys, the more important run from the centre eastwards, such as Strathconon, Strathbran, Strathgarve, Strathpeffer and Strathcarron. Excepting Glen Orrin, in the east central district, the longer glens lie in the south and towards the west. In the extreme south Glen Shiel runs between five mountains (the Five Sisters of Kintail) to its mouth on Loch Duich. The A87 passes down the glen. Further north lie Glen Elchaig, Glen Carron, and Glen Torridon. The railway from Dingwall runs through Glen Carron to Kyle of Lochalsh.

Geology

The central portion of this county is occupied by the younger highland schists or Dalradian series. These consist of quartzites, mica-schists, garnetiferous mica-schists and gneisses, all with a gentle inclination towards the southeast. On the eastern side of the county the Dalradian schists are covered unconformably by the Old Red Sandstone. The boundary runs southward from Edderton on Dornoch Firth, by Strathpeffer, to the neighborhood of Beauly. These rocks comprise red flags and sandstones, grey bituminous flags and shales. An anticlinal fold with a southwest–northeast axis brings up the basal beds of the series about the mouth of Cromarty Firth and exposes once more the schists in The Sutors (The Sutors of Cromarty) guarding the entrance to the firth. The western boundary of the younger schist is formed by the great pre-Cambrian dislocation line that traverses the county in a fairly direct course from Elphin on the north by Ullapool to Glencarron. Most of the area west of the line of disturbance is covered by Torridonian Sandstone, mainly dark reddish sandstones, grits and shales, resting unconformably on the ancient Lewisian gneiss with horizontal or slightly inclined bedding. The unconformity is well exposed on the shores of Gairloch, Loch Maree and Loch Torridon. These rocks, which attain a considerable thickness and are divisible into three sub-groups, build up the mountain districts of Applecross, Coigach and elsewhere.

Within the Torridonian tract the older Lewisian gneiss occupies large areas north of Coigach, on the east of Enard Bay, between Gruinard Bay and Loch Maree. Between the last named and Gairloch, on both sides of middle Loch Torridon and at many other spots smaller patches appear. The Lewisian gneiss is everywhere penetrated by basic dikes, generally with a northwest–southeast direction; some of these are of great breadth. The Torridonian rocks are succeeded unconformably by a series of Cambrian strata confined to a variable but narrow belt west of the line of main thrusting. This belt of Cambrian rocks has suffered an enormous amount of subordinate thrusting. It is composed of the following subdivisions in ascending order: falsebedded quartzite, Pipe Rock quartzite, fucoid beds and Olenellus band, serpulite grit, Durness dolomite and marble, Durness dolomite and limestone: but these are not always visible at any one spot. So great has been the disturbance in the region of thrusting that in some places, as in the neighborhood of Loch Kishorn and elsewhere, the rocks have been completely overturned and the ancient gneiss has been piled upon the Torridonian.

On the shore of Moray Firth at Rathie a small patch of Kimeridge shale occurs, and beneath the cliffs of Shandwick there is a little Lower Oolite with a thin seam of coal.

Climate and agriculture

The most fertile tracts lie on the eastern coast, especially in Easter Ross and the Black Isle, where the soil varies from a light sandy gravel to a rich deep loam. As of 1911, among grain crops oats were most generally cultivated, but barley and wheat were also raised. Turnips and potatoes were the chief green crops. The higher land contains much good pasturage, with many sheep, blackfaced being the principal breed. Most of the horses, principally half-breds between the old garrons (hardy, serviceable, small animals) and Clydesdales, were maintained for the purposes of agriculture. The herds of cattle, mainly native Highland or crosses, were large, many of them supplying the London market. Pigs were reared, though in smaller numbers than formerly, most generally by the crofters.

At one time the area under wood must have been remarkable, if we accept the common derivation of the word "Ross" as from the Old Irish ros, a wood, and there was until recent times a considerable extent of native woodland, principally pine, oak, ash and alder.

The fauna was noteworthy. Red and roe deer abounded, and foxes and alpine hares were common, while badgers and wild cats were occasionally trapped. Winged game was plentiful, and amongst birds of prey the golden eagle and osprey occurred. Waterfowl of all kinds frequented the sea lochs. Many rivers and lochs were rich in salmon and trout, and the pearl mussel was found in the bed of the Conon.

Other industries 

Tourism is a major industry in the region, with over 20% of the workforce employed in the wholesale, restaurant and hotels sector, second only to the public service sector. A little over 5% of the workforce are employed in agriculture, forestry and fishing, traditionally major industries in the region. The oil industry, which spurred a rapid increase in industrial development in the 1970s, is in decline, although still a major employer.

The Glen Ord and Glenmorangie distilleries are prominent whisky distilleries.

A railway, the Far North Line from Inverness, enters the county to the north of Beauly and runs northwards through Dingwall and onwards to Tain and along the southerly bank of the Dornoch Firth. From there the single-track line continues north/northeast through Sutherland to Thurso and Wick in Caithness.

Antiquities

The principal relics of antiquity - mainly stone circles, cairns and forts - appear in the eastern district. A vitrified fort crowns the hill of Knockfarrel in the parish of Fodderty, and there is a circular dun near the village of Lochcarron. Some fine examples of sculptured stones occur, especially those that, according to tradition, mark the burial-place of the three sons of a Danish king who were shipwrecked off the coast of Nigg. The largest and handsomest of these three crosses - the Clach a' Charraidh, or Stone of Lamentation - stands at Shandwick. It is about 10 feet (3 m) high and contains representations of the martyrdom of St Andrew and figures of an elephant and dog. It fell during a storm in 1847 and was broken in three pieces. On the top of the cross in Nigg churchyard are two figures with outstretched arms in the act of supplication; the dove descends between them, and below are two dogs. The cross was knocked down by the fall of the belfry in 1725, but has been riveted together. The third stone formerly stood at Hilton of Cadboll, but was removed for security to the grounds of Invergordon Castle.

Among old castles are those of Lochslin, in the parish of Fearn, said to date from the 13th century, which, though ruinous, possesses two square towers in good preservation; Balone, in the parish of Tarbat, once a stronghold of the Earls of Ross; the remains of Dingwall Castle, their original seat; and Eilean Donan in Loch Alsh, which was blown up by British warships during the abortive Jacobite rising in 1719.

Local government areas 
 See also Politics of the Highland Council area

The local government county was created under the Local Government (Scotland) Act 1889, which also established elected county councils for all counties in Scotland. The county of Ross and Cromarty was nominally a merger of two older administrative counties, Ross-shire and Cromartyshire, but there were some alterations to boundaries. The alterations became fully effective, for all purposes except parliamentary representation, in 1892.

The county included six burghs: Cromarty, Dingwall, Fortrose, Invergordon, Stornoway and Tain. Dingwall was the county town.

When counties and burghs were abolished as local government areas, in 1975, under the Local Government (Scotland) Act 1973, the area of the county was divided between two new areas, the Highland region and the Western Isles, and the Ross and Cromarty district of the region was created as one of eight districts of the new region.

Stornoway and the district of Lewis merged into the Western Isles. Also, the new Ross and Cromarty district excluded two other areas, which merged into other districts of the region. The electoral division of Kincardine was merged into Sutherland, and the South West electoral division (an area around and including Lochalsh) was merged into Skye and Lochalsh.

In 1996, under the Local Government etc (Scotland) Act 1994, the district was abolished and the Highland region was turned into a unitary council area. The new unitary authority, the Highland Council, then adopted the area of the former district as a council management area, and created area committees to represent it. The management area consisted then of 13 wards, each electing one councillor by the first past the post system of election. The council as a whole had 72 members.

Ward boundaries were altered in 1999, to create 80 new wards, but management area boundaries were unaltered. Therefore, area committees ceased to represent exactly the areas for which they were named and made decisions. 18 wards and, therefore, 18 councillors were related to the Ross and Cromarty management area.

Under the Local Governance (Scotland) Act 2004, ward boundaries changed again in 2007. Also, the eight management areas were abolished in favour of three new corporate management areas. The Ross and Cromarty area was divided between the Caithness, Sutherland and Easter Ross area and the Ross, Skye and Lochaber area.

References

Bibliography

External links
Genealogy of Ross and Cromarty, including list of parishes

Historical regions
Provinces of Scotland
Ross and Cromarty